

M09A Other drugs for disorders of the musculo-skeletal system

M09AA Quinine and derivatives
M09AA01 Hydroquinine
M09AA72 Quinine, combinations with psycholeptics

M09AB Enzymes
M09AB01 Chymopapain
M09AB02 Collagenase clostridium histolyticum
M09AB03 Bromelains
M09AB52 Trypsin, combinations

M09AX Other drugs for disorders of the musculo-skeletal system
M09AX01 Hyaluronic acid
M09AX02 Chondrocytes, autologous
M09AX03 Ataluren
M09AX04 Drisapersen
M09AX05 Aceneuramic acid
M09AX06 Eteplirsen
M09AX07 Nusinersen
M09AX08 Golodirsen
M09AX09 Onasemnogene abeparvovec
M09AX10 Risdiplam
M09AX11 Palovarotene
M09AX12 Viltolarsen
M09AX13 Casimersen
QM09AX90 Equine stem cells
QM09AX99 Combinations

References

M09